Bottle of Humans is the debut solo studio album by American hip hop artist Sole. It was released on Anticon in 2000. It peaked at number 14 on CMJ's Top 25 Hip-Hop chart.

Release
A dispute with Anticon's distributor caused the album to go out of print until it was remastered and reissued in 2003 with minor changes to the artwork and track listing.

"Nothing Fell Apart", "Understanding", and "MC Howard Hughes" were removed from the 2003 reissue. Also, on the cover art of the original issue, the words "sole" and "bottle of humans" appear to be pasted on. In the 2003 issue, the text is redone as it was meant to look, with no white border around the text.

Critical reception

Stanton Swihart of AllMusic gave the album 4.5 stars out of 5, stating that "At a diary-like 73 minutes, the album is too long to sustain the frequently gloomy psychological exploration, but this is maverick, outsider rap of a high quality." Steve Juon of RapReviews.com gave the album an 8 out of 10, saying, "If you're looking for a rap album that bucks trends and still has heavy hip-hop beats though, this is a good start." In 2008, Chris Martins of LA Weekly called it one of the "bona fide classics" from Anticon.

Track listing

References

External links
 

2000 debut albums
Sole (hip hop artist) albums
Anticon albums
Albums produced by Jel (music producer)
Albums produced by Daddy Kev
Albums produced by Alias (musician)
Albums produced by Odd Nosdam